The Roman Catholic Diocese of Viana is a diocese located in the city of Viana, in the Ecclesiastical province of São Luís do Maranhão in Brazil.

History
 30 October 1962: Established as Diocese of Viana from the Metropolitan Archdiocese of São Luís do Maranhão

Leadership
 Bishops of Viana (Roman rite), in reverse chronological order
 Bishop Evaldo Carvalho dos Santos, C.M. (2019.02.20 - present)
 Bishop Sebastião Lima Duarte (2010.07.07 - 2017.12.20), appointed Bishop of Caxias do Maranhão
 Bishop Xavier Gilles de Maupeou d’Ableiges (1998.02.18 – 2010.07.07)
 Bishop Adalberto Paulo da Silva, O.F.M. Cap. (1975.04.03 – 1995.05.24)
 Bishop Francisco Hélio Campos (1969.04.14 – 1975.01.23)
 Bishop Amleto de Angelis, M.S.C. (1963.05.30 – 1967.02.25)

References
 GCatholic.org
 Catholic Hierarchy

Roman Catholic dioceses in Brazil
Christian organizations established in 1962
Viana, Roman Catholic Diocese of
Roman Catholic dioceses and prelatures established in the 20th century